Mangisto "Manny" Arop (born October 1, 1990) is a South Sudanese-Canadian professional basketball player who last played for Finke Baskets of the ProA. He is a 6 ft 6 in (1.98 m) tall small forward/shooting guard.

College career
Arop played college basketball at Indiana State University, from 2012 to 2014. He helped lead the Sycamores to a 2-yr record of 41-26 (.612); including 3 wins over "Power 5" conference schools and 2 post-season NIT berths.

He currently ranks in the top 75 in career scoring (744 pts), 20th in career defensive rebounds (250), 25th in 3-pointers (78), 34th in blocks (28), 28th games started (63).

Prior to the 2011–12 season; Arop spent two seasons at Gonzaga University; appearing in 59 games for the Bulldogs.

Professional career
After going undrafted in the 2014 NBA Draft, Arop signed with the Swedish pro club, Norrkoping Dolphins. He started 39 games for the Dolphins, posting a 9.0 ppg average and 4.5 rbg average and helping them to a 3rd-place finish in the Basketligan; he scored 54 points (10.8 ppg) in the Basketligan playoffs.  On July 7, 20125; following the Dolphins season, Arop signed with Finke Baskets of Germany. However, he only played two official matches for the team before the two sides parted ways.

FIBA career
Arop was a member of 4 Canadian National teams; Canadian University National Team (2013), Canadian Junior National Team (2011), Canadian U-19 National Team (2009) and the Canadian U-18 National Team (2008). He was named to the All-World Championships U-19 team (Honorable Mention) during the 2009 Championships.

Awards and accomplishments

College
 Missouri Valley Conference tournament All-Tournament Team: (2014)
Missouri Valley Conference All-Conference Team (Honorable Mention): (2014)
 Missouri Valley Conference Tournament Finalist (2014)
 Missouri Valley Conference Regular Season Runner Up (2014)
 West Coast Conference Tournament Winner (2011)
 West Coast Conference Tournament Finalist (2010)
 West Coast Conference Regular Season Champion (2010)

Canadian National Team
All World Championships U-19 Honorable Mention (2009)
Nike Global Challenge All-Tournament Team (2009)

References

1990 births
Living people
Basketball people from Ontario
Canadian expatriate basketball people in Germany
Canadian expatriate basketball people in the United States
Canadian men's basketball players
Gonzaga Bulldogs men's basketball players
Indiana State Sycamores men's basketball players
Niagara River Lions players
Norrköping Dolphins players
Paderborn Baskets players
Shooting guards
Small forwards
South Sudanese emigrants to Canada